The Out of Iraq Caucus was a Congressional caucus in the United States House of Representatives, created in June 2005.

It consisted of House members who advocated the departure of United States troops from Iraq, effectively ending U.S. participation in the Iraq War. There were 73 members of the 110th Congress in the caucus, all of whom belonged to the Democratic Party. It was chaired by Maxine Waters, Representative for the 43rd District of California.

External links
Out of Iraq Congressional Caucus

Political organizations based in the United States
Caucuses of the United States Congress
Iraq War